John Victor Macmillan OBE DD (1877–1956) was the fifth Bishop of Dover in the modern era who was later translated to Guildford.

Born into a publishing family (he was an uncle of Prime Minister Harold Macmillan), he was educated at Eton and Magdalen College, Oxford, where he was awarded 1st Class Honours in Modern History. From 1904 to 1915 he was resident chaplain to the Archbishop of Canterbury, Randall Davidson. He was a Temporary Chaplain to the Forces 1915–16 and 1917–19, and he conducted Davidson on his tour of the Western Front in 1917. He proved invaluable as an efficient and effective organiser at the headquarters of the Deputy Chaplain-General, for which he was appointed an OBE in 1919. He was vicar of Kew, Surrey, and Archdeacon of Maidstone (1921–1934), before his elevation to the episcopate.

References

1877 births
People educated at Eton College
Alumni of Magdalen College, Oxford
Archdeacons of Maidstone
Bishops of Dover, Kent
Bishops of Guildford
Officers of the Order of the British Empire
Holders of a Lambeth degree
20th-century Church of England bishops
1956 deaths
World War I chaplains
Royal Army Chaplains' Department officers